Bug is the original soundtrack album, on the Lionsgate label,  of the 2006 film Bug, and contains such artists as Sean & Sara Watkins (of Nickel Creek), Chainsaw Kittens, Susan Tedeschi, Jerry Leiber, Leon Russell and more. The theme from Bug is performed by System of a Down lead singer Serj Tankian. The lead track is performed by Stone Temple Pilots lead singer Scott Weiland.

The original score is composed by Brian Tyler. The score was released on iTunes on May 22, 2007. The soundtrack by various artists, was released in stores and on iTunes on May 22.

Track listing
"Beautiful Day" - 5:09 - remake of Stone Temple Pilots-outtake "Learning to Drive"  Scott Weiland (of Stone Temple Pilots) - previously unreleased
"No Way to Live" - 2:06 Sean & Sara Watkins (of Nickel Creek) - previously unreleased
"She Gets" - 2:33 Chainsaw Kittens - Flipped Out in Singapore (1992)
"Cowboy Boots" - 2:47 The Backsliders - Throwin' Rocks At The Moon (1997)
"I Fell in Love" - 3:28 Susan Tedeschi - Wait for Me (2002)
"Shake 'em Up and Let 'em Roll" - 2:31 Jerry Leiber and The Coasters - 50 Coastin' Classics (1992)
"Searchin'" - 2:39 Alvin Robinson - "Something You Got" / "Searchin'" (1964)
"Viva Mi Sinaloa" - 3:17 Los Tigres del Norte - Directo al Corazon (2005)
"This Masquerade" - 4:22 Leon Russell - Carney (1972)
"Drug" - 2:33 Brian Tyler - previously unreleased
"Peterception" - 3:01 Brian Tyler - previously unreleased
"Bug Theme" - 1:31 Serj Tankian (of System of a Down) - previously unreleased

Songs in the movie but not on the soundtrack include:
 "Disappearing Act" (C. Cornell) - Chris Cornell - previously unreleased
 "Innermission" (S. Tankian, P. Jolly) - Serj Tankian, Petra Jolly - previously unreleased
 "Kick Kid" (T. Meade) - Chainsaw Kittens - Angel on the Range (EP) (1993)

Personnel 

 Chris Bellman – Mastering
 Chris Fagot – Soundtrack Coordination
 Jay Faires – Music Supervisor, Soundtrack Producer, Music Executive
 David Falzone – Film Music Supervisor
 Jeanne Fay – Music Clearance
 Tricia Holloway – Film Music Supervisor
 Serj Tankian – Additional Music
 Brian Tyler – Composer

Score

The film is scored by Brian Tyler and the musical direction/supervision is by Jay Faires. The score is released as digital download on May 22, 2007.

Track listing

References

External links
Bug - Official soundtrack website at Lionsgate, including audio samples

Film scores
2007 soundtrack albums
Lionsgate Records soundtracks
Brian Tyler soundtracks
Horror film soundtracks